The state highways are arterial routes of a state, linking district headquarters and important towns within the state and connecting them with national highways or highways of the neighboring states.

Introduction
Karnataka has a good road network. There are 14 national highways and 115 state highways with total length of 28,311 km.

List of state highways in Karnataka

External links
 Public Works Department, Government of Karnataka

 
Karnataka State Highways
State Highways